National Route 43 is a national highway of Japan connecting Nishinari-ku, Osaka, and Nada-ku, Kobe.

Route data
Length: 30.2 km (18.77 mi).

References

043
Roads in Osaka Prefecture
Roads in Hyōgo Prefecture